John Murray ( – 24 March 1714) was a Scottish lawyer and politician.

He was a Commissioner to the Parliament of Scotland for Selkirk from 1689 to 1702 and for Selkirkshire from 1702 until the Act of Union 1707. He was one of the Scottish representatives to the first Parliament of Great Britain, but may not have taken his seat as he was appointed a Lord of Session as Lord Bowhill on 7 June 1707.

Family
He is the second son of John Murray and Anne Douglas, and a brother of James Murray, Lord Philiphaugh. By his mother, he is a first cousin of Archibald Douglas, 13th of Cavers. He is also the grandfather of James Murray.

References
 Leigh Rayment, . Retrieved 13 November 2011.
 Leigh Rayment, . Retrieved 13 November 2011.
 D.W. Hayton, Murray, John (c.1667-1714), of Bowhill, Selkirk in The History of Parliament 1690-1715, 2002. Retrieved 13 November 2011.

1667 births
Year of birth uncertain
1714 deaths
Burgh Commissioners to the Parliament of Scotland
Shire Commissioners to the Parliament of Scotland
Members of the Convention of the Estates of Scotland 1689
Members of the Parliament of Scotland 1689–1702
Members of the Parliament of Scotland 1702–1707
Members of the Parliament of Great Britain for Scottish constituencies
British MPs 1707–1708
Bowhill